Brickellia longifolia, the longleaf brickellbush, is a shrub in the family Asteraceae. It is found in the Colorado Plateau and Canyonlands region of the southwestern United States, in Arizona, Utah, Nevada, and western Colorado.

Some authors consider the closely related Mojave Desert plants  as a variety of B. longifolia but others recognize it as a distinct species, B. multiflora.

Description

Growth pattern

Leaves and stems

Inflorescence and fruit
Brickellia longifolia blooms from June to September.
Small green flowers are in clusters of 3-5 per head, with only disk flowers, and many clusters on a stalk that is elongated from the top of each branch.

Habitat and range
It can be found in moist areas near seeps and riparian areas in Southern Utah, with occurrences from California to Arizona.

References

External links
Calflora Database: Brickellia longifolia  (Longleaf brickellbush, Willowleaf brickellia)

longifolia
Flora of the Southwestern United States
Flora of the California desert regions
Natural history of the Mojave Desert
Plants described in 1873
Taxa named by Sereno Watson
Flora without expected TNC conservation status